Humen North railway station is a railway station in Dongguan, Guangdong, China. It is an intermediate stop on the Guangzhou–Shenzhen intercity railway. It opened with the line on 15 December 2019.

The station is located underground and perpendicular to Humen railway station, providing an interchange.

References 

Railway stations in Guangdong
Railway stations in China opened in 2019